Michał Lewandowski (born 2 August 1996) is a Polish footballer who plays as a goalkeeper for Italian  club Messina.

Club career
Lewandowski started his football with polish club Stal Mielec before moving to Italy and signing with second division side Crotone. He played for the club in the youth Campionato Nazionale Primavera before leaving the start of the 2016–17 season due to needing to have surgery on his wrist.

In 2016, he started his senior career with Avezzano in the Italian fourth division where he would play in 33 matches, keeping 10 clean sheets. Lewandowski then went on to sign with Italian third division club Teramo who he played for, for four years making 69 appearances in the championship and the cup, keeping 24 clean sheets. His time at the club also included a brief spell at Monopoli.

On 3 August 2021, he signed a two-year contract for Messina.

On 6 November 2022, he scored the second goal in a 3–2 home Serie C league win against Monterosi by means of a free kick from his own half.

References

External links
 

1996 births
Living people
People from Mielec
Polish footballers
Association football goalkeepers
Serie C players
Serie D players
F.C. Crotone players
Avezzano Calcio players
S.S. Teramo Calcio players
S.S. Monopoli 1966 players
A.C.R. Messina players
Polish expatriate footballers
Polish expatriate sportspeople in Italy
Expatriate footballers in Italy